Lelang union is a union of Fatikchhari Upazila of Chittagong District, Bangladesh.

Geography
Area of Lelang: 11,062 acres (44.77 km2).

Location
 North: Kanchan nagar Union
 East:  Lakshmichhari Upazila
 South: Nanupur Union
 West:  Rangamatia Union

Population
As of the 1991 Bangladesh census, Lelang union had a population of 17,642 and 2592 house units.

Educational institutions
Shahnagar high school and Charaliahat high school are the main educational institution in the union. Without this some institutes are -
Shahnagar govt.primary school,
Sanyashirhat govt.primary school.
Shahnagar Darul ulum madrasha.
Shahnagar Madinatul ulum madrasha.
South shahnagar Hafejia madrasha.
Alhaj Motiur Rahman Chowdhury Primary School
Gopalghatta Govt. High School
Lelang govt.primary school,
Lelang Mohammadia Islamia madrasha,
Bonde-A-Raja Mohila Dakil madrasha,

Marketplaces and bazars
Sanyasirhat  is main marketplace  in the union.
There are others marketplace are - 
Noyahat ( Friday and Monday two days in week evening time ),
Islamia bazar South shahnagar ( morning market all day after sunrise to 09:00am ).
Charaliahat.
Gopalghata Anondo Bazar.
Gopalghata Adarsha Bazar

Villages and mouzas
Some villages are:
Lelang
Pattilkul
Shahnagar.
Gopalghata
Raipur

References
Information:

Unions of Fatikchhari Upazila